Anbaq-e Hajjikhan (also Romanized as Anbāq-e Ḩājjīkhān; also known as Anbāq) is a village in Qeshlaq Rural District, in the Central District of Ahar County, East Azerbaijan Province, Iran. The 2006 census noted its existence, but did not report its population.

References 

Populated places in Ahar County